The 1975 Virginia Slims of Philadelphia  was a women's tennis tournament played on indoor carpet courts at the Palestra in Philadelphia, Pennsylvania in the United States that was part of the 1975 Virginia Slims World Championship Series. It was the fourth edition of the tournament and was held from March 24 through March 29, 1975. Fifth-seeded Virginia Wade won the singles title and earned $15,000 first-prize money.

Finals

Singles
 Virginia Wade defeated  Chris Evert 7–5, 6–4

Doubles
 Evonne Goolagong /  Betty Stöve defeated  Rosemary Casals /  Billie Jean King 4–6, 6–4, 7–6(5–3)

Prize money

References

Virginia Slims of Philadelphia
Advanta Championships of Philadelphia
Virginia Slims of Philadelphia
Virginia Slims of Philadelphia
Virginia Slims of Philadelphia